Federico Guillermo Lussenhoff (born 14 January 1974) is an Argentine former professional footballer who played as a central defender.

In a career which lasted almost 20 years, he represented clubs in Mexico and Spain other than in his own country.

Club career
Born in Venado Tuerto, Santa Fe Province, Lussenhoff began his career at Rosario Central, and also had spells at San Lorenzo de Almagro, Mexican clubs Toros Neza and Cruz Azul and CD Tenerife and RCD Mallorca in Spain.

In the latter nation, to where he arrived in January 1999, he was relegated from La Liga in his first season, then became an undisputed starter as the Canary Islands side returned to the top flight in 2001, under Rafael Benítez. With its Balearic Islands neighbours he managed to be relatively used during two years, helping them win the 2003 edition of the Copa del Rey.

In 2005, after 192 competitive matches in five and a half seasons in Spanish football, Lussenhoff returned to his country and signed with Club Atlético River Plate. He dropped down to the second division three years later, moving to Talleres de Córdoba.

Lussenhoff returned to Spain on 20 January 2010, as he joined his compatriot Nestor Gorosito – coach – at Xerez CD as director of football.

Honours
Rosario Central
Copa CONMEBOL: 1995

Mallorca
Copa del Rey: 2002–03

References

External links

Argentine League statistics 

1974 births
Living people
People from General López Department
Argentine people of German descent
Argentine footballers
Association football defenders
Argentine Primera División players
Primera Nacional players
Rosario Central footballers
San Lorenzo de Almagro footballers
Club Atlético Colón footballers
Club Atlético River Plate footballers
Talleres de Córdoba footballers
Liga MX players
Toros Neza footballers
Cruz Azul footballers
La Liga players
Segunda División players
CD Tenerife players
RCD Mallorca players
Argentine expatriate footballers
Expatriate footballers in Mexico
Expatriate footballers in Spain
Argentine expatriate sportspeople in Mexico
Argentine expatriate sportspeople in Spain
Sportspeople from Santa Fe Province